Chionanthus virginicus (white fringetree) is a tree native to the savannas and lowlands of the southeastern United States, from New Jersey south to Florida, and west to Oklahoma and Texas.

Growth

	
The bark is scaly, brown tinged with red. The shoots are light green, downy at first, later becoming light brown or orange.
 
It is usually dioecious, though occasional plants bear flowers of both sexes.

Etymology
The species name was originally cited by Linnaeus as Chionanthus virginica, treating the genus as feminine; however, under the provisions of the ICBN, the genus is correctly treated as masculine, giving the species ending as virginicus. Other English names occasionally used in the Appalachians include Grancy Gray Beard and Old Man's Beard.

Cultivation and uses
Although native in the southeastern United States, it is hardy in the north and is extensively planted in gardens, where specimens are often grown with multiple trunks. The white flowers are best seen from below. Fall color is a fine, clear yellow, a good contrast with viburnums and evergreens.  It prefers a moist soil and a sheltered situation. It may be propagated by grafting on Ash (Fraxinus sp.). The wood is light brown, sapwood paler brown; heavy, hard, and close-grained.

Traditional uses
The dried roots and bark were used by Native Americans to treat skin inflammations. The crushed bark was used in treatment of sores and wounds.

Threats
In 2014, white fringetrees in Ohio were reported to be hosting infestations of the emerald ash borer, an insect native to Asia that has become a highly destructive invasive pest of ash trees in North America. Since then, emerald ash borer has been found in white fringetrees in Illinois, Indiana, Ohio, and Pennsylvania, indicating to researchers that white fringetrees are being utilized by emerald ash borers throughout the range where the species overlap. Symptoms of infestation include crown dieback and epicormic sprouting.

References

virginicus
Trees of the Eastern United States
Plants used in traditional Native American medicine
Trees of the Southeastern United States
Ornamental trees
Dioecious plants
Trees of the Northeastern United States
Plants described in 1753
Taxa named by Carl Linnaeus